Luminessence is an album composed by American pianist Keith Jarrett featuring saxophonist Jan Garbarek and the Südfunk-Sinfonieorchester conducted by Mladen Gutesha recorded in April 1974. It was released on the ECM label in 1975. Jarrett does not perform on this album. Gutesha had conducted the Stuttgart strings on "Metamorphosis," from Jarrett's 1974 album In the Light, and would appear as conductor on Arbour Zena (1976).

While the music for string orchestra was notated, the saxophone part was improvised. Producer Manfred Eicher recalled: "Luminessence shows Keith's affinity for Jan Garbarek's playing. He studied Jan's music and the scales he used, and he also got the concept of the harmonic structures – the framework of the piece – with Jan in mind... Jan was indeed honoured that Keith wanted to write this for him." Similarly, Jarrett biographers Ian Carr and Wolfgang Sandner both praised Jarrett's ability to compose a score suited to Garbarek's style and abilities. Carr wrote: "the few melodies Jarrett writes sound like Garbarek improvisations, so great is the rapport between the two men," while Sandner commented that Jarrett "knew which kind of musical background was needed to ignite Jan Garbarek's melancholic saxophone into excursions through the jazz cosmos."

Reception 

The Allmusic review by Richard S. Ginell awarded the album 4 stars and states, "The concept is not unlike that of Stan Getz's Focus, but this music is far more static, downcast, and free of the pulse of jazz. As was characteristic of his writing then, Jarrett's string parts are mostly turgid and thick-set, indulging in weird, sliding microtones on "Windsong", weighted down by some kind of emotional burden. Particularly when delivering piercing sustained notes on soprano, Garbarek often sounds like a native of the Middle East".

Writing for The New York Times, Stephen Davis stated that Luminessence "recalls both Gabriel Faure and Pierre Dubois," and, pairing it with In the Light, commented: "These albums belong neither to jazz or 'modern' music and they do not make easy listening. Both titles imply that Jarrett 'sees' his music as a colorful physical energy as did Scriabin almost a century ago."

Track listing 
All compositions by Keith Jarrett

 "Numinor" - 13:49
 "Windsong" - 6:32
 "Luminessence" - 15:23

Personnel 
 Jan Garbarek - tenor and soprano saxophones
 Südfunk-Sinfonieorchester conducted by Mladen Gutesha

Production
 Manfred Eicher - producer
 Kurt Rapp, Martin Wieland - recording engineers
 Barbara and Burkhart Wojirsch / Sascha Kleis - cover design
 Terje Mosnes / Kira Tolkmitt - photography

References 

Keith Jarrett albums
Jan Garbarek albums
1975 albums
Albums produced by Manfred Eicher
ECM Records albums